Nguyễn Thị Thanh Thủy (born 24 November 1993 in Trà Vinh) is a Vietnamese judoka and a former boxer.

Career
From Tra Vinh, her brother Nguyen Thanh Hoang is a Judo referee. She is a former boxer. She came to prominence when she won gold at the 2015 Southeast Asian Games in the 
(-52kg) weight category despite being only a late replacement in the squad. She was selected to compete at the 2020 Summer Games but lost against Romanian Andreea Chițu in the first round.

References

External links
 

1993 births
Living people
Place of birth missing (living people)
Vietnamese female judoka
Olympic judoka of Vietnam
Judoka at the 2020 Summer Olympics
21st-century Vietnamese women